Citizen Soldier(s) may refer to:

 Citizen soldier, a member of a militia
 Citizen Soldier (film), a 1976 drama film
 Citizen Soldier (TV program)
 2016 Citizen Soldier 400, a 2016 NASCAR race
 "Citizen/Soldier", a song by 3 Doors Down
 Citizen Soldiers, a 1997 book by Stephen E. Ambrose 
 Citizen Soldier (character), a character in the comic book series Stormwatch: Team Achilles

See also
 Citizen Force (disambiguation)
 Citizen (disambiguation)